Miloš Stanojević (born 27 May 1984 in Belgrade, SR Serbia, Yugoslavia) is a Serbian rower.

References

1984 births
Living people
Serbian male rowers
Sportspeople from Belgrade
World Rowing Championships medalists for Serbia
European Rowing Championships medalists